Chionanthus pachyphyllus grows as a tree up to  tall, with a trunk diameter of up to . The bark is light brown. The flowers are yellow. The specific epithet pachyphyllus is from the Greek meaning "thick leaf". Habitat is forests from sea level to  altitude. C. pachyphyllus is endemic to Borneo.

References

pachyphyllus
Endemic flora of Borneo
Trees of Borneo
Plants described in 1954